In 2022, there were approximately 478,000 games available for the Google-developed Android operating system on the Google Play Store; this list clearly does not include all of them.

List

There are  Android games currently on this list.

See also

List of video game genres

Notes

References

 
Google lists
Lists of mobile apps
Video game lists by platform